spamd is a Unix name for a daemon and may refer to:
 OpenBSD's spamd(8), which are designed to work in conjunction with OpenBSD's Packet Filter on OpenBSD, NetBSD, FreeBSD and DragonFly BSD. 
 SpamAssassin mail filtering daemon